Garib (film) is an Indian film. It was released in 1942.

The film also had Baby Meena (Meena Kumari) as a child artist.

References

External links
 

1942 films
1940s Hindi-language films
Indian black-and-white films